This is a list of lighthouses in Faroe Islands.

Lighthouses

See also
 Lists of lighthouses and lightvessels

References

External links

 

Faroe Islands

Lighthouses
Lighthouses